The Neiwan line is a railway branch line in Taiwan operated by the Taiwan Railways Administration. It is located in Hsinchu County.

History 
The Neiwan line was completed on 11 September 1951. It became a popular tourist site in the early 2000s. A through-service between Neiwan and Taipei on Saturdays and Sundays started in 2004.

The section between Hsinchu and Zhudong was temporarily closed from 28 February 2007 in order to facilitate the construction of an electrified, dual-track, grade-separated route from Hsinchu through Zhuzhong and, via a new sub-branch line (the Liujia Line), to the newly opened Hsinchu HSR station. Concurrently, three infill stations were added between Hsinchu and Zhuzhong. The upgraded section was reopened on 11 November 2011.

The section past Zhuzhong remains single-track and unelectrified.

Liujia branch 

The Liujia Line, which connects TRA Hsinchu Station and THSR Hsinchu Station, branches off from the Neiwan Line at Zhuzhong Station.

Operations 
The Neiwan Line is principally serviced by Local Trains (區間車).

On some special occasions, diesel-powered versions of the Tzu-Chiang Limited Express (自強號) have been used on the route.

Stations

References

External links 

 Railway Reconstruction Bureau project page for the Liujia branch (in Chinese)

TRA routes
Railway lines opened in 1951
1951 establishments in Taiwan
3 ft 6 in gauge railways in Taiwan